GBA-6 (Hunza-I) is a constituency in Hunza District for Gilgit Baltistan Assembly which is represented by Obaidullah Baig.

History

Constituency 
Before 2015, the constituency was in the Hunza-Nagar District. In 2015, when Hunza was made a separate district, GBA-6 was made its constituency.

Candidates 
Mir Ghazanfar Ali Khan of Pakistan Muslim League N for the session 2015-20. After appointment of Mir Ghazanfar Ali Khan as Governor, the political seat of the constituency became empty. His son Shah Salim Khan was elected in by elections of 2016. He was later disqualified by the honorable court being a bank defaulter in 2018. After disqualification of Shah Salim Khan the seat remained vacant till elections 2020.

Members

Election results

2009
Wazir Baig of PPP became member of assembly by getting 5,270 votes.

2015
Mir Ghazanfar Ali Khan of Pakistan Muslim League (N) won this seat by getting 8,245 votes.

2016 
This constituency was vacated by Shah Salim Khan. As of 9 April 2018 he has been disqualified by the national bank for defaulting on loans.

References

Gilgit-Baltistan Legislative Assembly constituencies